Villar del Humo is a municipality in the province of Cuenca, Castile-La Mancha, Spain. According to the 2004 census (INE), the municipality has a population of 372 inhabitants.

It is an important location for prehistoric rock art.  A cultural park has been designated to conserve the sites and they have also been included in the World Heritage Site Rock Art of the Iberian Mediterranean Basin.

References

Municipalities in the Province of Cuenca